Odontodrassus aphanes is a species of ground spider native to East Asia and Oceania, ranging from Myanmar to Japan. It has been introduced to Jamaica.

References 

Gnaphosidae
Spiders of Asia
Spiders of Oceania